The 1992 Holy Cross Crusaders football team was an American football team that represented the College of the Holy Cross during the 1992 NCAA Division I-AA football season. Holy Cross finished second in the Patriot League. 

In their first year under head coach Peter Vaas, the Crusaders compiled a 6–5 record. Marcus Duckworth, Ron Hooey, Tom McDonald and John Powell were the team captains.

The Crusaders outscored opponents 175 to 153. Their 4–1 conference record placed second in the six-team Patriot League standings. 

The Crusaders were ranked No. 18 in the preseason national Division I-AA rankings, and despite a season-opening loss rose to No. 14 in the poll released September 14, but further losses dropped them out of the top 20 for the rest of the season.

Holy Cross played its home games at Fitton Field on the college campus in Worcester, Massachusetts.

Schedule

References

Holy Cross
Holy Cross Crusaders football seasons
Holy Cross Crusaders football